Dries Roelvink (born 1 January 1959 in Amsterdam) is a Dutch singer of the Levenslied genre. He was born in the Jordaan and was raised in the folkish tradition of the Jordaanlied.

In 2007 he tried to perform at the Rotterdam Ahoy music venue but sold too few tickets.

He starred in the 2008 film I Love Dries by the Dutch film director Tom Six.

References

External links
  Website of Dries Roelvink

1959 births
Living people
Dutch male singers
Musicians from Amsterdam